Keystone was used as the marque of two brass era automobile companies.

History 

The Keystone and Keystone Six were built for the Munch-Allen Motor Car Company of DuBois, Pa. Howard Motor Works in Yonkers, NY, built the first thirty cars before production moved to DuBois in 1909. In 1910 production returned to Yonkers shortly before the company failed. The Keystone Six was a 60 horsepower six-cylinder automobile on a 122 inch wheelbase. All body styles cost $2,250, .

The second Keystone was an American automobile manufactured from 1914 until 1915.  Designed by Chas C. Snodgrass and built in Pittsburgh, it used a Rutenber 55 hp six engine. It was built on a 138-inch wheelbase. It failed before a company could be set up to sell it.

See also

Keystone Six at ConceptCarz

References

Brass Era vehicles
Defunct motor vehicle manufacturers of the United States
Manufacturing companies based in Pennsylvania
Vehicle manufacturing companies established in 1914
Vehicle manufacturing companies disestablished in 1915
1914 establishments in Pennsylvania
1915 disestablishments in Pennsylvania
Companies based in Pittsburgh
Defunct companies based in Pennsylvania
1900s cars
1910s cars
Motor vehicle manufacturers based in Pennsylvania